Leesha Eclairs is an Indian television and film actress who has worked in Tamil productions.

Career 
Leesha Eclairs completed her studies at Ethiraj College for Women, before taking up acting. In late 2016, she was simultaneously working on seven film projects. The most prominent of the seven, and her first release, was Balle Vellaiyathevaa (2016), where she portrayed the daughter of the antagonist in the film. Other ventures included the unreleased horror My Dear Lisa opposite Vijay Vasanth, and the comedy drama Sirikka Vidalama alongside Nithin Sathya. She has also appeared among an ensemble cast in the social drama Podhu Nalan Karudhi (2019), portraying the love interest of Santhosh Prathap's character.

In October 2018, Leesha's first television series Kanmani began airing on Sun TV. The series featured her in the lead role, and Leesha shot scenes in Georgia and India for the project.

In 2022, Leesha was seen in Sathyasiva's bilingual period film 1945, where she portrays a traditional South Indian girl. A further film ready for release is the romantic drama Priyamudan Priya, where she appears in the titular role.

Filmography

Television

Films

References

External links 
 

Living people
Actresses in Tamil cinema
Indian film actresses
21st-century Indian actresses
Indian television actresses
Actresses in Tamil television
Year of birth missing (living people)